The Wonder Years 1983-1993 is two-CD package compilation album with accompanying book released by Reunion Records in 1993, and is intended to be a greatest hits album with a career retrospective of the contemporary Christian musician, Michael W. Smith. The elaborate slipcase packaging contains a   spiral-bound book that contains facing pairs of pages highlighting each of his prior eight albums. Each spread featured photographs and an accompanying background story on this period in his career. Inside the back cover are two trays which contain the two picture CDs.

The album won a Dove Award for Recorded Music Packaging of the Year at the 24th GMA Dove Awards in 1993. This album has since gone out of print in favor of the more modest (and more focused) greatest hits collection The First Decade (1983-1993), which was released later that same year. This album is also notable to collectors for being the only issued CD containing the radio single version of "I Know" from The Live Set.

Track listing

Chart performance

Weekly charts

References

1993 compilation albums
Michael W. Smith compilation albums
Reunion Records albums